On is the third studio album by indie rock band Imperial Teen.  It is the follow-up to their second full-length record What is Not to Love (1998), and was released in the U.S. on April 9, 2002 from Merge Records. On March 30, 2009, Amazon.com selected it as the 43rd greatest indie rock album of all time.

Track listing
"Ivanka" – 3:15
"Baby" – 2:44
"Sugar" – 3:25
"Million $ Man" – 4:22
"Captain" – 2:39
"Our Time" – 2:17
"Undone" – 4:07
"Mr. & Mrs." – 3:06
"Teacher's Pet" – 2:16
"City Song" – 2:28
"My Spy" – 3:26
"The First" – 4:21

References

2002 albums
Imperial Teen albums
Merge Records albums